Sir Anthony Michael William Battishill  (born 4 July 1937) is a former British senior civil servant. He served as the Chairman of the Board of Inland Revenue from 1986 to 1997.

Battishill was appointed Knight Commander of the Order of the Bath (KCB) in the 1989 New Year Honours. He was promoted to Knight Grand Cross (GCB) in the 1997 New Year Honours.

References

Chairmen of the Board of Inland Revenue
Knights Grand Cross of the Order of the Bath
Place of birth missing (living people)
1937 births
Living people
Honorary Fellows of the London School of Economics